The 1994 Big League World Series took place from August 12–20 in Fort Lauderdale, Florida, United States. In a championship rematch, Taipei, Taiwan defeated host Broward County, Florida twice in the championship game. It was Taiwan's second straight championship.

After using a two bracket system for US and International teams in 1993, the traditional 11 team bracket returned.

Teams

Results

References

Big League World Series
Big League World Series